Rajya Sabha elections were held on three dates in 2014, to elect members of the Rajya Sabha, Indian Parliament's upper chamber. The elections were held in February, June, and November to elect respectively 55, 6, and 11 of its 245 members, from 16 of the States. They are held by an open ballot (for public scrutiny) on a single transferable vote (STV) basis among State legislators.  Being even-numbered, 2014 was a year in which about 30% of the State Legislature-elected 233-seat component of the body is elected.

In addition to the 72 seats re-filled in this year of the six-year cycle (as the term of seat tenure is six years), 13 by-elections were held in 2014.

As of 2020, this is the last year in which the Bharatiya Janata Party has lost seats.

February elections
The elections in February were from 16 State legislatures, and all were held on February 7, 2014.

Maharashtra
Has 19 members.

Odisha
Has 10 members.

Tamil Nadu
Has 18 members.

West Bengal
Has 16 members.

Andhra Pradesh
Has 11 members.

Assam
Has 7 members.

Bihar
Has 16 members.

Chhattisgarh
Has 5 members.

Gujarat
Has 11 members.

Haryana
Has 5 members.

Himachal Pradesh
Has 3 members.

Jharkhand
Has 6 members.

Madhya Pradesh
Has 11 members.

Manipur
Has 1 member.

Rajasthan
Has 10 members.

Meghalaya
Has 1 member.

June elections

Arunachal Pradesh
Has 1 member.

Karnataka
Has 12 members.

Mizoram
Has 1 member.

November  elections
The elections in November were from Uttar Pradesh and Uttarkhand, and were held on November 20, 2014.

Uttar Pradesh 
Has 31 members.

Uttarakhand 
Has 3 members.

Bye-elections

13 by-elections were held (caused by resignation, death or disqualification).

Andhra Pradesh

Bihar

Notes

References

2014 elections in India
2014